is a Japanese retired kickboxer, mixed martial artist, known for his career in K-1.

Biography
Yuichiro Nagashima was born in 1984 in the city of Nishinomiya, Hyogo. He started learning Judo when he was an elementary school. He continued training Judo until the graduation of Middle School. During his High School life, he practiced Karate, but he attended training only once or twice a week. He first intended to become a Professional Wrestler, but was deemed too short, so he decided to be a fighter instead.

Mixed martial arts
Nagashima joined the team of Nippon Kempo and started training seriously when he was matriculated in University of Marketing and Distribution Sciences. In addition, Nagashima started participating professional mixed martial arts bouts. He also started cosplaying anime characters during his entrance to the ring.

Kickboxing
In 2007, Nagashima shifted his focus to kickboxing and has gone on to become known as the "Otaku Kickboxer" due to his love of anime and cosplay entrances before bouts. He won ten consecutive victories to start his career, fighting for Deep, Mars and New Japan Kickboxing Federation. On November 9, 2008, he defeated Teruaki Furukawa for the vacant NJKF Super welterweight title; this marked the first time a kickboxer from a non-NJKF affiliated gym had won an NJKF title. On January 25, 2009, he was chosen and awarded 2008 Outstanding Performance Award by NJKF, and also given 3 more awards certified combat sports medias.

K-1
After winning the title, Nagashima was offered by K-1. He participated K-1 World MAX 2009 Japan Tournament  on February 23, 2009, and he knocked out Hayato at 2R at the quarterfinal, but he was beaten by Yuya Yamamoto and lost by TKO because of being cut at the semifinal.

After the Japanese tournament, Nagashima was offered to fight against Albert Kraus from Netherlands on April 21. They engaged in a heated war of words before the bout where Kraus said "he seems to be a gay". The fight ended in Nagashima losing by knockout in round one. On October 26, Nagashima was offered to fight against Xu Yan from China. Although he trained at Masato's gym, he was knocked out at round one. In December, he was awarded the 2009 Walkout of the Year by Inside MMA of HDNet.

On March 27, 2010, Nagashima participated to K-1 World Max 2010 Japan tournament. He won the tournament with 3 consecutive knock outs. Although he wanted to defend his NJKF title after this tournament, he returned his title as on 1 April because he was going to participate the world tournament and it was hard to arrange his schedule for defending title.

On December 31, 2010, Nagashima took part in a "mixed rules" bout against Judo and Brazilian Jiu-Jitsu expert Shinya Aoki at Dynamite!! 2010, the annual New Year's Eve fight festival. One round was to be held under Kickboxing rules and the other under Mixed Martial Arts rules. A Coin Toss decided that the Kickboxing round was to commense first. Aoki took advantage of the fact that he only had to survive through a single three-minute round of Kickboxing and thus threw pointless attacks like flying dropkicks and rolling heel kicks while holding onto the ring ropes in order to run the clock down. As the second round began, and Aoki now in his element under MMA rules, he dropped immediately for a Double Leg Takedown, while Nagashima launched a Flying Knee square into Aoki's jaw. The blow instantly knocked out Aoki, after which Nagashima followed up with a number of hammerfists on the supine Aoki. The referee stepped in and stopped the fight four seconds into the period.

He faced Henri van Opstal at REBELS 13 in Tokyo on October 28, 2012 with a place at the Shoot Boxing World Tournament 2012 on the line. He lost via unanimous decision (30-29, 30-29, 29-28).

He lost a one-sided unanimous decision to Robin van Roosmalen at Glory 4: Tokyo - 2012 Heavyweight Grand Slam in Saitama, Japan on December 31, 2012 after being dropped in round one.

He lost to Yoshihiro Sato by unanimous decision at Hoost Cup: Kings in Nagoya, Japan on June 16, 2013.

Nagashima stopped a three-fight skid when he beat Hiroki Shishido by unanimous decision at Shoot Boxing Battle Summit Ground Zero Tokyo 2013 in Tokyo, Japan on November 15, 2013.

Professional wrestling
On March 6, 2011, Nagashima appeared in the puroresu promotion Pro Wrestling Zero1 to challenge fellow rookie Daichi Hashimoto, who was scheduled to face Masahiro Chono, and said that he had also made his debut in wrestling and soon would be Daichi's rival. Nagashima began training in the Zero1 dojo under Shinjiro Otani, who was also Hashimoto's trainer. Although Daichi was the original target to Yuichiro, veteran wrestler Kohei Sato offered to wrestle Nagashima first, so Yuichiro had his debut on May 5 at the Korakuen Hall against him, with th Otaku Kickboxer winning the bout. The match was highly praised and some said that Yuichiro's skill was such that he seemed to have years of experience. Later, on June 14, Yuichiro had his first match against Daichi, teaming with former yokozuna and K-1 fighter Akebono to defeat Hashimoto & Otani. Two months after, Nagashima teamed up with Hashimoto and Otani to defeat Ryoji Sai, Kamikaze & Munenori Sawa.

After their last meeting, Nagashima announced his intention to face Masahiro Chono, who had wrestled against Hashimoto. Chono agreed and the match was held in Inoki Genome Federation, with Nagashima in the losing side. Thereafter, Yuichiro began competing actively for IGF, achieving significant victories over Munenori Sawa and Bob Sapp. Upon his return to Zero1, Nagashima came in a feud with Fujita Hayato, being defeated by Fujita in a singles match. This was his final match of the year, as Nagashima returned to kickboxing shortly after.

In 2013, Nagashima made a return to pro wrestling in IGF, beating Black Tiger in two consecutive matches.

Lethwei 
In February 2020, Nagashima made his debut in Lethwei rules against Burmese Aut Chin Thwai. Nagashima lost after he injured his leg at the third round. He entered the match wearing the first anime cosplay he wore in his career, that of Haruhi Suzumiya from the eponymous franchise, and suggested this was his last fight.

Retirement 
On September 23, 2021, Nahashima was scheduled to face Shohei Asahara, Yasuomi Soda and Yusaku Nakamura in his retirement exhibition match at DEEP☆KICK 55. As in the previous occasion, he came to the match wearing a significant cosplay, the same Miku Hatsune costume he wore in his K-1 championship in November 2008, and thanked the fans for their support in his 14 years career.

Titles
Professional
 2010 K-1 World MAX 2010 -70kg Japan Tournament winner
 2008 The 1st New Japan Kickboxing Federation Super welterweight champion
 2008 MARS Blaster bout tournament A block winner
 2006 RR Lightweight tournament winner
 Amateur
 2006 Kempo 7th West Japan Championship 4th place
 Kakuto Yuseikai Karate 8th championship winner
 2006 Nippon Kempo 61st National Sports Festival Runner Up

Awards
 2008 Outstanding Performance Award (NJKF, January 25, 2009)
 2008 Kakutogi Tsushin Award (NJKF, January 25, 2009)
 2008 Fullcontact KARATE Award (NJKF, January 25, 2009)
 2008 BoutReview Award (NJKF, January 25, 2009)
 2009 Walkout of the Year (Inside MMA of HDNet, December 2009)

Lethwei record 

|- style="background:#fbb;"
|2020-02-22
| Loss
| align="left" | Aut Chin Thwai
| Lethwei in Japan 15: Kizuna
| Osaka, Japan
| KO
| 3
|-
| colspan=9 | Legend:

Kickboxing record 

|- style="background:#fbb;"
| 2018-01-27 || Loss ||align=left| Qiu Jianliang|| Glory of Heroes: Qingdao || Qingdao, China || TKO (Punches) || 3 || 1:23
|-
|-  bgcolor="#FFBBBB"
| 2017-11-26 || Loss ||align=left| Chuchai Kaewsamrit|| HOOST CUP KINGS OSAKA 2 || Osaka, Japan || Decision (unanimous)  ||3|| 3:00 
|-
|- style="background:#fbb;"
| 2017-04-23 || Loss ||align=left| Artem Pashporin || Kunlun Fight 60 – 70 kg World Max 2017 Group G Tournament Semi-Finals || Zunyi, China || TKO (Ref.stop/3 Knockdowns) || 2 || 1:22
|-
|- style="background:#fbb;"
| 2016-12-05 || Loss ||align=left| Takuya Imamura || KNOCK OUT Vol.0 || Japan || KO (Right Cross) || 2 ||
|-
|-  bgcolor="#C5D2EA"
| 2016-10-30 || Draw||align=left| Tian Xin || Kunlun Fight 54 - Super Fight || Wuhan, China || Extra Round Decision (Draw) || 4 || 3:00
|-
|- style="background:#fbb;"
| 2016-06-05 || Loss ||align=left| Gu Hui || Kunlun Fight 45 - Qualification tournament for 70 kg 16 man Tournament Group E Semi Final|| Chengdu, China || Decision (Unanimous) || 3 || 3:00
|-
|-  bgcolor="#FFBBBB"
| 2015-10-03 || Loss ||align=left| Li Yankun || XTREME MUAY THAI 2015 The Venetian Macao || Macao, China || Decision (unanimous)  ||3|| 3:00 
|-
|-  bgcolor="#FFBBBB"
| 2015-04-05 || Loss ||align=left| Nishikawa Yasuhira || DEEP || Tokyo, Japan || Decision (unanimous)  ||3|| 3:00
|-
|-  bgcolor="#FFBBBB"
| 2015-02-21 || Loss ||align=left| Yuki Sakamoto || Shoot Boxing 2015 act. I || Tokyo, Japan || Decision (unanimous)  ||3|| 3:00
|-
|-  bgcolor="#C5D2EA"
| 2015-01-31 || Draw ||align=left| Yi Long || Wu Lin Feng World Championship 2015 || Chongqing, China || Decision (Unanimous) || 3 || 3:00
|-
|-  bgcolor="#FFBBBB"
| 2014-12-29 || Loss ||align=left| Hinata || Blade 1 || Tokyo, Japan || Decision  || 3 || 3:00
|-
|-  bgcolor="#fbb"
| 2014-11-16 || Loss|| align=left| Jenrop Punpanmuang || HOOST CUP KINGS WEST || Osaka, Japan || Decision (Unanimous) || 3 || 3:00
|-  bgcolor="#CCFFCC"
| 2014-09-09 || Win ||align=left| Yi Long || Wu Lin Feng || Khorgos, China || TKO  || 2 || 
|-
|-  bgcolor="#FFBBBB"
| 2014-06-16 || Loss ||align=left| Danilo Zanolini || RISE 100 - Blade 0 - || Tokyo, Japan || DQ (Fouls) ||  ||

|-  bgcolor="#CCFFCC"
| 2014-04-29 || Win ||align=left| Daiki Watabe || RISE 99 || Tokyo, Japan || Ext.R Decision (Unanimous) || 4 || 3:00 

|-  bgcolor="#CCFFCC"
| 2013-11-15 || Win ||align=left| Hiroki Shishido || Shoot Boxing Battle Summit Ground Zero Tokyo 2013 || Tokyo, Japan || Decision (Unanimous) || 3 || 3:00
|-
|-  bgcolor="#cfc"
| 2013-10-14 || Win|| align=left| Tanansak SuranareeGym || M-FIGHT ～Shuken 13～ Part 2 || Tokyo, Japan || Decision (Unanimous) || 3 || 3:00

|-  bgcolor="#FFBBBB"
| 2013-06-16 || Loss ||align=left| Yoshihiro Sato || Hoost Cup: Kings || Nagoya, Japan || Decision (unanimous) || 3 || 3:00 
|-  bgcolor="#FFBBBB"
| 2012-12-31 || Loss ||align=left| Robin van Roosmalen || Glory 4: Tokyo || Saitama, Japan || Decision (Unanimous) || 3 || 3:00
|-  bgcolor="#FFBBBB"
| 2012-10-28 || Loss ||align=left| Henri van Opstal || REBELS.13 || Tokyo, Japan || Decision (Unanimous) || 3 || 3:00 
|-  bgcolor="#CCFFCC"
| 2011-09-25 || Win ||align=left| Kenmun || K-1 World MAX 2011 –70 kg Japan Tournament Final || Osaka, Japan || Decision (Unanimous) || 3 || 3:00
|-
|-  bgcolor="#FFBBBB"
| 2010-11-08 || Loss ||align=left| Mike Zambidis || K-1 World MAX 2010 Final Quarter-final || Tokyo, Japan || TKO (Referee Stoppage) || 3 || 0:53
|-
|-  bgcolor="#CCFFCC"
| 2010-07-05 || Win ||align=left| Andre Dida || K-1 World MAX 2010 Final 16 - Part 1 || Tokyo, Japan || Decision (Majority) || 3 || 3:00
|-
! style=background:white colspan=8 |
|-
|-  bgcolor="#CCFFCC"
| 2010-03-27 || Win ||align=left| Hiroki Nakajima || K-1 World MAX 2010 -70kg Japan Tournament Final || Saitama, Japan || KO (Right Hook) || 3 || 1:58
|-
! style=background:white colspan=8 |
|-
|-  bgcolor="#CCFFCC"
| 2010-03-27 || Win ||align=left| Ryuji || K-1 World MAX 2010 -70kg Japan Tournament Semifinal || Saitama, Japan || TKO (Referee Stoppage) || 1 || 1:44
|-  bgcolor="#CCFFCC"
| 2010-03-27 || Win ||align=left| Yuji Nashiro || K-1 World MAX 2010 -70kg Japan Tournament Quarterfinal || Saitama, Japan || TKO (Referee Stoppage) || 1 || 0:39
|-  bgcolor="#FFBBBB"
| 2009-10-26 || Loss ||align=left| Xu Yan || K-1 World MAX 2009 World Championship Tournament Final || Yokohama, Japan || KO (Left Hook) || 1 || 1:04
|-  bgcolor="#FFBBBB"
| 2009-04-21 || Loss ||align=left| Albert Kraus || K-1 World MAX 2009 World Championship Tournament Final 16 || Tokyo, Japan || KO (Punches) || 1 || 1:07
|-  bgcolor="#FFBBBB"
| 2009-02-23 || Loss ||align=left| Yuya Yamamoto || K-1 World MAX 2009 Japan Tournament Semi-final || Tokyo, Japan || TKO (Doctor Stoppage) || 3 || 0:59
|-  bgcolor="#CCFFCC"
| 2009-02-23 || Win ||align=left| Hayato || K-1 World MAX 2009 Japan Tournament Quarter-final || Tokyo, Japan || TKO (Referee Stoppage)|| 2 || 0:36
|-  bgcolor="#CCFFCC"
| 2008-12-22 || Win ||align=left| Sakushi || DEEP Protect Impact 2008 || Tokyo, Japan || TKO (Doctor Stoppage) || 2 || 0:39
|-  bgcolor="#CCFFCC"
| 2008-11-09 || Win ||align=left| Teruaki Furukawa || NJKF "Start of the New Legend XIII" || Tokyo, Japan || TKO (Referee Stoppage) ||1 || 1:04
|-
! style=background:white colspan=8 |
|-
|-  bgcolor="#CCFFCC"
| 2008-09-27 || Win ||align=left| Soichiro Miyakoshi || NJKF "Start of the New Legend XI" || Tokyo, Japan || TKO (Referee Stoppage) || 1 || 1:50 
|-  bgcolor="#CCFFCC"
| 2008-06-08 || Win ||align=left| Kenta || NJKF West Swell || Osaka, Japan || Decision (Majority 2-1) || 5 || 3:00
|-  bgcolor="#CCFFCC"
| 2008-05-03 || Win ||align=left| Marmai || Khaolak stadium || Khao Lak, Thailand || KO || 4 ||
|-  bgcolor="#CCFFCC"
| 2008-02-11 || Win ||align=left| Shine Soo || 'MARS 11 2nd Anniversary MARS Blaster Bout Tournament A block Final || Tokyo, Japan || KO (Left Hook) || 3 || 0:18
|-
! style=background:white colspan=8 |
|-
|-  bgcolor="#CCFFCC"
| 2008-02-11 || Win ||align=left| K.Worwanchai || "MARS 11 2nd Anniversary MARS Blaster Bout Tournament A block" Semi-final|| Tokyo, Japan || Decision (Unanimous) || 2 || 3:00
|-  bgcolor="#CCFFCC"
| 2007-12-09 || Win ||align=left| Norimasa Iwasaki || MARS 10 "All-Out War" || Tokyo, Japan || Decision (Unanimous) || 3 || 3:00
|-  bgcolor="#CCFFCC"
| 2007-10-13 || Win ||align=left| Junichi Maruyama || MARS 09 || Osaka, Japan || TKO (Referee Stoppage) || 1 || 2:27
|-  bgcolor="#CCFFCC"
| 2007-07-08 || Win ||align=left| Kenji Ueda || DEEP 30 Impact || Osaka, Japan || KO || 1 || 1:38
|-  bgcolor="#CCFFCC"
| 2007-04-15 || Win ||align=left| Fumihito Fukano || NJKF "Fighting Evolution IV Kenshinjuku 10th anniversary event" || Osaka, Japan || KO (Right High Kick) || 1 || 2:04
|-

Mixed martial arts record 

|-
| Loss
| align=center| 4-3
| Andy Souwer
| KO (punches)
| Rizin Fighting Federation 2
| 
| align=center| 1
| align=center| 5:28
| Saitama, Japan
| 
|-
|-
| Loss
| align=center| 4-2
| Hiroshi Shiba
| Decision (Unanimous)
| Real Rhythm: 5th Stage
| 
| align=center| 2
| align=center| 5:00
| Osaka, Japan
| 
|-
| Win
| align=center| 4-1
| Hiromu Nagado
| KO (Punch)
| Pancrase: Blow 8
| 
| align=center| 1
| align=center| 0:12
| Osaka, Japan
| 
|-
| Win
| align=center| 3-1
| Yusuke Kagiyama
| KO (Punches)
| Real Rhythm: 4th Stage
| 
| align=center| 1
| align=center| 3:45
| Osaka, Japan
| 
|-
| Win
| align=center| 2-1
| Tsuneo Kimura
| TKO (Punches)
| Double R: 3rd Stage
| 
| align=center| 1
| align=center| 0:41
| Osaka, Japan
| 
|-
| Win
| align=center| 1-1
| Tsuyoshi Ono
| TKO (Punches)
| Double R: 3rd Stage
| 
| align=center| 1
| align=center| 0:37
| Osaka, Japan
| 
|-
| Loss
| align=center| 0-1
| Satoru Takadaya
| Submission (Armbar)
| Powergate 2: War Cry Of Soul
| 
| align=center| 1
| align=center| 1:59
| Osaka, Japan
|

Mixed rules record 

|Loss
|align=center| 1-2
| Xu Xiaodong
| TKO (Punches)
| Lumpinee Boxing Stadium
| 
|align=center| 2
|align=center| 0:35
| Bangkok, Thailand
|-
|Loss
|align=center| 1-1
| Katsunori Kikuno
| TKO (Punches)
| Fight For Japan: Genki Desu Ka Omisoka 2011
| 
|align=center| 2
|align=center| 2:34
| Saitama City, Saitama, Japan
|-
| Win
|align=center| 1–0
| Shinya Aoki
| KO (Flying Knee)
| Dynamite!! 2010
| 
|align=center| 2
|align=center| 0:04
| Chūō-ku, Saitama, Japan

Legend:

See also 
List of male kickboxers
List of K-1 events

References

External links
 Official K-1 Profile
 MMA Madness Profile
 MMA Universe Profile
 Official blog
 Official Gree blog

1984 births
Living people
People from Nishinomiya
Japanese male kickboxers
Japanese male mixed martial artists
Cosplayers
Japanese male professional wrestlers
Japanese male karateka
Sportspeople from Hyōgo Prefecture
Kunlun Fight kickboxers
Japanese Lethwei practitioners
Mixed martial artists utilizing Nippon Kempo
Mixed martial artists utilizing karate
Mixed martial artists utilizing shootboxing